Singularity is the fifth studio album by English electronic musician and producer Jon Hopkins, released on 4 May 2018 through Domino Records.

It was announced on 6 March 2018, with the release of the first single, "Emerald Rush". The second single, "Everything Connected", was released on 25 April, while the third, "Singularity", was released on 4 May, along with the album.

The album follows Hopkins's companion previous album, Immunity. It was released to critical acclaim and was nominated at the 2019 Grammy Awards for Best Dance/Electronic Album.

Critical reception

Singularity received widespread acclaim from critics upon its release. At Metacritic, which assigns a normalised rating out of 100 to reviews from mainstream publications, the album received an average score of 84, based on 26 reviews, indicating "universal acclaim". It received critical acclaim from a few publications including NME, and The Skinny, who each attributed it a perfect score.

musicOMH gave the album high praise, saying: "From the beginning this is music that sweeps the listener away, an aural massage that takes care of the hair standing on end at the top of the head to the pair of heels itching to start moving on the dance floor." XLR8R compared the album to Hopkins' previous album Immunity, saying: "Hopkins' merging of emotional material with hypnotic, physical grooves appeared effortless. Singularity continues in the vein of Immunity, though its depth of feeling is greater, and rhythmic power more potent." AllMusic was more positive of Singularity than Hopkins' previous album Immunity, stating: "...filled with frayed feedback, skillfully crafted beats, and gentle piano melodies, as well as the occasional breathy vocals. This time out, there seems to be an extra shot of adrenaline added, and the album seems to reflect a deeper spiritual quest, both inwards and outwards." Stephen Carlick of Exclaim! praised the album saying, "It's an album that, in its best moments, finds one of electronic music's great minds operating in peak form."

The Observer was critical of the album, saying: "Too often, though, you’re left wishing for the thuggish bass and head-severing hi-hats of less cerebral dance music. There’s not enough food for the brain or fuel for the feet here".

Track listing

Personnel 
 Jon Hopkins – music, record producer, engineering, mixing

Additional Personnel
 Leo Abrahams – guitar (track 1), orchestra choir (track 5) 
 Emma Smith – strings (track 1, 2, 4, 5, 8)
 Sasha Lewis – programming (track 1 to 4)
 London Voices – choir (track 5)
 Jon Thorne – double bass (track 4)
 Lisa Elle – vocals (track 2)
 Josephine Stephenson – vocals (track 5)
 Olivia Chaney – vocals (track 5)
 Oliver Griffiths – vocals (track 5)
 Ben Perry – chorus masters (track 5)
 Terry Edwards – chorus masters (track 5)
 Austin Tufts – drum (track 8)

Charts

References 

2018 albums
Jon Hopkins albums
Domino Recording Company albums